Cauca Valley may refer to:
 the valley of the Cauca River
 Valle del Cauca Department, "Cauca Valley Department"